The 2010 elections for the Oregon Legislative Assembly determined the composition of both houses for the 76th Oregon Legislative Assembly. The Republican and Democratic primary elections were on May 18, 2010, and the general election was held on November 2, 2010. Sixteen of the Oregon State Senate's thirty seats were up for election, as were all 60 seats of the Oregon House of Representatives.

In the previous session, the Democrats held supermajorities in both chambers: 18–12 in the Senate and 36–24 in the House. Following the election, Republicans reduced the Democratic majority to 16–14 in the Senate and gained enough seats in the House to make the chamber evenly divided between the parties, 30–30.

Oregon Senate
12 of the 16 Senate seats up for election were held by Democrats, and the other four seats were previously held by Republicans. The Republicans held all their seats and added two: in District 26, Chuck Thomsen defeated Brent Barton for the seat previously held by Rick Metsger, who resigned to run for Oregon State Treasurer, and in District 20, incumbent Democrat Martha Schrader lost to Republican Alan Olsen by 227 votes.

House of Representatives
In the House, with all 60 seats up for re-election, Republicans gained six seats, making the chamber evenly split between Democrats and Republicans for the next session.

See also 
 75th Oregon Legislative Assembly (2009–2010)
 76th Oregon Legislative Assembly (2011–2012)

Sources 
ORESTAR, the online elections system of the Oregon Secretary of State's Elections Division

References 

Legislative
Oregon Legislative Assembly elections
Oregon legislative